The arrowhead warbler (Setophaga pharetra) is a species of bird in the family Parulidae.
It is endemic to Jamaica.
Its natural habitat is subtropical or tropical moist montane forests.

References

 Raffaele, Herbert; James Wiley, Orlando Garrido, Allan Keith & Janis Raffaele (2003) Birds of the West Indies, Christopher Helm, London.

Arrowhead Warbler
Endemic birds of Jamaica
arrowhead warbler
arrowhead warbler
Taxonomy articles created by Polbot